Painiac is a 1995 EP released by Raymond Watts (as PIG). Painiac has only ever been released in Japan. The version of the song that appears on this single is that of an earlier recording than the version that appears on Sinsation.

Track listing
 "Painiac" – 5:08
 "Lamentous Momentous" – 4:53
 "Find It Fuck It Forget It" (Live) – 3:00
 "Painiac (Rattle & Cum Mix)" – 5:24
 "Painiac (Mekon/Artery Mix)" – 6:04

All tracks written by Raymond Watts.

Personnel
Raymond Watts
Steve White – guitar
Santos de Castro – drums (3)
Anna Wildsmith – additional lyrics

Pig (musical project) albums
1995 EPs